The Operations in the Kohat Pass was a British-Indian military expedition to the North-West Frontier Province in Pakistan.

References

Military expeditions
History of Pakistan